Nursing Open is a bimonthly open access peer-reviewed medical journal covering all aspects of nursing. It is published by Wiley.

History
The journal was established in 2014 with Roger Watson as the founding editor-in-chief. The current editor is Diana Baptiste (Johns Hopkins University).

Abstracting and indexing
The journal is abstracted and indexed in:

According to the Journal Citation Reports, the journal has a 2021 impact factor of 1.942.

References

External links

Publications established in 2014
General nursing journals
Wiley (publisher) academic journals
Bimonthly journals
English-language journals